Engels, formerly known as Pokrovsk and Kosakenstadt, is a city in Saratov Oblast, Russia. It is a port located on the Volga River across from Saratov, the administrative center of the oblast, and is connected to it with a bridge. Historically an important center for Volga Germans, the city was known jointly as Pokrovsk in Russian and as Kosakenstadt in German, until it was renamed after Friedrich Engels in 1931. Engels served as the capital of the Volga German Autonomous Soviet Socialist Republic from 1918 to 1941.

It was previously known as Pokrovska sloboda (until 1914), Pokrovsk (until 1931).

History
Engels was founded as a sloboda named Pokrovska Sloboda by Ukrainian Chumak settlers in 1747. During the reign of Catherine the Great, ethnic Germans were encouraged to settle in the Volga region and many moved into the town, making it a major center of the Volga German culture. It was granted official town status and renamed Pokrovsk in 1914.. At that time, the town was commonly known as Kosakenstadt ("Cossacks' Town") in German, alongside its official Russian name. During the Russian Civil War the region came under control of the communist Russian Soviet Federative Socialist Republic, and in 1918 it became the capital of the newly established Volga German Autonomous Soviet Socialist Republic within the RSFSR. Pokrovsk/Kosakenstadt was renamed Engels in 1931, in honour of German communist philosopher Friedrich Engels. The Volga German ASSR was disestablished in 1941 following the German invasion of the Soviet Union, and the city became part of Saratov Oblast. Its German inhabitants suffered persecution as Soviet authorities feared they could be spies for Nazi Germany. All Germans were expelled from Engels, with most being sent to far away in Siberia and the Kazakh SSR. On August 26, 2011, a monument in honor of the Russian-German victims of repression within the Soviet Union was unveiled in the city.

Engels-2 (air base), a Russian Air Force base is nearby.

Administrative and municipal status
Within the framework of administrative divisions, Engels serves as the administrative center of Engelssky District, even though it is not a part of it. As an administrative division, it is, together with four rural localities, incorporated separately as Engels City Under Oblast Jurisdiction—an administrative unit with the status equal to that of the districts. As a municipal division, Engels City Under Oblast Jurisdiction, together with the work settlement of Privolzhsky and one rural locality (the settlement of Geofizik) in  Engelssky District, are incorporated within Engelssky Municipal District as Engels Urban Settlement.

Economy
Engels is an industrial city. The Trolza factory manufactures trolleybuses for Russia's public transportation networks. The Engelssky factory of transport mechanical engineering produces rolling stock for railways. The Bosch-Saratov plant, previously Autotractor Spark Plugs, produces spark plugs, and the German Henkel company operates a factory producing domestic laundry detergent and chemical products for the auto-industry. The Engelssky pipe factory makes steel electro-welded pipes, steel water pipeline, and profile pipes.

In August 2015 a prototype 1520 mm gauge Bombardier Traxx F120MS locomotive was unveiled at a ceremony to mark the inauguration of First Locomotive Company's factory at Engels.

Historical population

Sister cities
 Edmond, Oklahoma, United States

Notable people
 

 Lev Kassil (1905 - 1970),  writer
Alfred Schnittke (1934 - 1998), composer
Sergey Victorovich Ulyanov (born 1946), scientific and industrial engineer

References

Notes

Sources

External links

Official website of Engels 
Engels Business Directory 

Cities and towns in Saratov Oblast
Populated places on the Volga
Novouzensky Uyezd
Populated places established in 1747
German communities in Russia
Volga German people
1747 establishments in the Russian Empire
Friedrich Engels